Change of Season is the fourteenth studio album by American pop music duo Daryl Hall & John Oates. The album was released in October 1990, by Arista Records. The lead single "So Close" peaked at No. 11 on the Billboard Hot 100 and was their last Top 40 hit, while the second single "Don't Hold Back Your Love" just missed the Top 40 reaching #41. It was their second and final album for Arista.

Track listing
Produced by Daryl Hall, John Oates and T-Bone Wolk, except where noted

Production 
 Track 1 Produced by Danny Kortchmar and Jon Bon Jovi; Engineered by Ross Hogarth. Mixed by Paul Lani.
 Tracks 2–6, 9 & 10 Arranged and Produced by Daryl Hall, John Oates and T-Bone Wolk. Recorded and Mixed by Larry Alexander; Assistant Engineer – Pete Moshay. Mixed by Joe Pirrera.
 Track 7 Produced by Ric Wake; Arranged by Ric Wake and Daryl Hall. Engineered and Mixed by Bob Cadway; Assistant Engineers – Dan Hetzel and Thomas R. Yezzi.
 Track 8 Produced by David Tyson. Engineered by Kevin Doyle, David Knight, Greg Dromin, Tom Nellen, Charley Pollard, Andrew Raffi, Craig Portelis and Bill Molina. Mixed by Kevin Doyle.
 Track 11 Produced by David A. Stewart and Daryl Hall. Engineered by Pete Moshay and Duane Seykora; Assistant Engineer – Pat McDougal. Mixed by Brian Malouf.
 Recorded at A-Pawling Studios (Pawling, NY); Cove City Sound Studios (Long Island, NY); New River Studios (Fort Lauderdale, FL); Sunset Sound Factory, Conway Recording Studios and Westlake Audio (Hollywood, CA); Studio 55 and Orca Studios (Los Angeles, CA).
 Mixed at A-Pawling Studios, Conway Recording Studios, The Hit Factory (New York City, NY), The Music Palace (West Hempstead, NY), Summa Studios (Los Angeles, CA) and Chapel Studios (Los Angeles, CA).
 Mastered by Bob Ludwig at Masterdisk (New York City, NY).
 Production Coordination – Pete Moshay (Tracks 2–6, 9, 10 & 12); David Barratt (Track 7); Shari Sutcliffe (Track 8).
 Guitar Technician – Mel Terpos
 Art Direction and Photography – Prudence Whittlesey 
 Management – Champion Entertainment Organization, Inc.

Personnel

The band 
 Daryl Hall – lead vocals (1-9, 11, 12), backing vocals, acoustic piano, synthesizers, electric guitar, acoustic guitar, mandolin, mandola, tambourine
 John Oates – backing vocals, lead vocals (2, 4, 10), electric guitar, acoustic guitar, bongos, clay drum
 Bob Mayo (Aka Bobby Mayo) – keyboards, Hammond B3 organ, backing vocals
 Mike Klvana – additional synthesizer programming
 Pete Moshay – programming, sequencing, tambourine
 Tom "T-Bone" Wolk – Wurlitzer electric piano, electric guitar, acoustic guitar, bass, percussion, tambourine, backing vocals
 Jimmy Rip – electric guitar, acoustic guitar
 Mike Braun – drums, percussion
 Jimmy Bralower – Akai MPC60 drum programming
 Charlie DeChant – saxophone

Additional musicians 
 Benmont Tench – keyboards (1)
 Dean Kraus – keyboards (7)
 Rich Tancredi – keyboards (7)
 David Tyson – keyboards and bass (8)
 Danny Kortchmar – guitars (1)
 Waddy Wachtel – guitars (1)
 Bob Cadway – guitars (7)
 Buzz Feiten – guitars (8)
 Michael Thompson – guitars (8)
 David A. Stewart – guitars (11)
 Randy Jackson – bass (1)
 Doug Stegmeyer – bass (7)
 Bob Glaub – bass (11)
 Kenny Aronoff – drums and percussion (1)
 Joey Franco – drums (7)
 Pat Mastelotto – drums (8)
 Jesse Levy – cello (2, 4)
 Olivia Koppell – viola  (2, 4)
 Regis Iandorio – violin (2, 4)
 Eileen Ivers – violin (9, 10)
 Arif Mardin – string arrangements and conductor (2, 4)
 Susie Davis – backing vocals (2)
 Wendy Fraser – backing vocals (8)
 Portia Griffin – backing vocals (8)
 Mary Cassidy – backing vocals (11)
 Marcella Detroit – backing vocals (11)
 Siobhan Fahey – backing vocals (11)
 Toni Halliday – backing vocals (11)
 Nan Vernon – backing vocals (11)

Charts

References

1990 albums
Hall & Oates albums
Albums arranged by Arif Mardin
Arista Records albums